Bruce Burton (birth registered fourth ¼ 1952) is an English former rugby union and professional rugby league footballer who played in the 1970s and 1980s.

Background
Bruce Burton's birth was registered in Wakefield district, West Riding of Yorkshire, England.

Playing career

County honours
Bruce Burton played 3 times for Yorkshire whilst playing for Halifax and once whilst playing  for Yorkshire while at Castleford scoring a try in the 19-16 victory over Lancashire at Castleford's stadium on 12 September 1978.

County Cup Final appearances
Bruce Burton played , was man of the match winning the White Rose Trophy, and scored 2-tries  and a drop goal in Castleford's 17-7 victory over Featherstone Rovers in the 1977 Yorkshire County Cup Final during the 1977–78 season at Headingley Rugby Stadium, Leeds on Saturday 15 October 1977.

BBC2 Floodlit Trophy Final appearances
Bruce Burton played , and scored a try in Castleford's 12-4 victory over Leigh in the 1976 BBC2 Floodlit Trophy Final during the 1976–77 season at Hilton Park, Leigh on Tuesday 14 December 1976.

Player's No.6 Trophy Final appearances
Bruce Burton played , and scored 5-goals in Halifax's 22-11 victory over Wakefield Trinity in the 1971–72 Player's No.6 Trophy Final during the 1971–72 season at Odsal Stadium, Bradford on Saturday 22 January 1972, and played stand off, and scored a try in Castleford's 25-15 victory over Blackpool Borough in the 1976–77 Player's No.6 Trophy Final during the 1976–77 season at The Willows, Salford on Saturday 22 January 1977.

References

External links
Search for "Burton" at rugbyleagueproject.org

1952 births
Living people
Castleford Tigers players
English rugby league players
English rugby union players
Halifax R.L.F.C. players
Rugby league five-eighths
Rugby league players from Wakefield
Rugby union players from Wakefield
Yorkshire rugby league team players